Galina Petrovna Bystrova (née Dolzhenkova; ; 8 February 1934 – 11 October 1999) was a Soviet athlete. She competed in the 80 m hurdles at the 1956, 1960 and 1964 Olympics with the best achievement of fourth place in 1956. In 1964 she also took part in the newly introduced pentathlon event and won a bronze medal. She also won three European titles, two in the pentathlon (1958 and 1962) and one in the hurdles (1958), and set three world records in these events. Domestically she won six national titles, in the pentathlon, hurdles and long jump.

Bystrova was born to a Russian family in Azerbaijan, where her father served with the Soviet Border Guard. After his service ended, the family moved to Nizhny Novgorod, where Bystrova started training in gymnastics. In 1952 she met her future husband and athletics coach Vasily Bystrov, who convinced her to switch to athletics. After retiring from competitions, Bystrova worked as an athletics coach alongside her husband. Her last years were marred by osteoarthritis developed as a result of arduous training and by conflicts were her husband. She died aged 65.

References

External links
 

1934 births
1999 deaths
Soviet pentathletes
Olympic athletes of the Soviet Union
Athletes (track and field) at the 1956 Summer Olympics
Athletes (track and field) at the 1960 Summer Olympics
Athletes (track and field) at the 1964 Summer Olympics
Burevestnik (sports society) athletes
Olympic bronze medalists for the Soviet Union
People from the Nakhchivan Autonomous Republic
Azerbaijani people of Russian descent
European Athletics Championships medalists
Medalists at the 1964 Summer Olympics
Olympic bronze medalists in athletics (track and field)
Azerbaijani female hurdlers
Soviet female hurdlers
Olympic female pentathletes